Benjamin McKenzie Schenkkan (born September 12, 1978) is an American actor and commentator. He is best known for his starring television roles as Ryan Atwood on the teen drama The O.C. (2003–2007), Ben Sherman on the crime drama Southland (2009–2013), and James Gordon on the crime drama Gotham (2014–2019). McKenzie made his film debut in the Academy Award-nominated film Junebug (2005), before appearing in films including 88 Minutes (2007), Goodbye World (2013), Some Kind of Beautiful (2014), and Line of Duty (2019). In 2020, he made his Broadway debut in the Bess Wohl play Grand Horizons. 

Outside of acting, McKenzie is noted for his critical commentary on the cryptocurrency bubble and fraud with journalist Jacob Silverman. Their forthcoming book on the subject, Easy Money, will be published in 2023.

Early life and education
Benjamin McKenzie Schenkkan was born in Austin, Texas. He is of Dutch-Jewish, Scottish, and English descent. He is one of three sons born to Frances Schenkkan, a poet, and Pete Schenkkan, an attorney. He has two younger brothers, both of whom are former actors. He is the brother-in-law of photojournalist Scout Tufankjian.

His grandfather, Robert F. Schenkkan was a professor at the University of Texas at Austin and worked on passing the Public Broadcasting Act of 1967. Notably, he is a nephew of Pulitzer Prize-winning playwright Robert Schenkkan; McKenzie appeared in his 2019 work The Investigation. His middle name, McKenzie, is his paternal grandmother's maiden name; he uses it as part of his stage name to avoid confusion with actor Ben Shenkman.

For middle school, he attended St. Andrew's Episcopal School, where he was friends and flag football teammates with future Super Bowl MVP Drew Brees. He attended Stephen F. Austin High School, playing wide receiver and defensive back for the school's football team. From 1997 to 2001 he attended the University of Virginia, his father and paternal grandfather's alma mater, where he majored in foreign affairs and economics.

Acting career

2001–2007: Early career and The O.C. 
After graduating from college in 2001, McKenzie moved to New York City where he worked in part-time jobs and performed in some off-off-Broadway productions. During this period, he also participated in summer stock theater and the Williamstown Theatre Festival.

At age twenty-three he moved to Los Angeles where he waited tables and slept on the floor of his friend Ernie Sabella's apartment. He was soon cast as Ryan Atwood in The O.C. On August 5, 2003, Fox premiered the television series, about affluent teenagers with stormy personal lives in Orange County, California. The show became an overnight success and made McKenzie famous. His performance in The O.C. earned him "Choice Breakout TV Star – Male" and "Choice TV Chemistry" nominations in the Teen Choice Awards as well as "Choice TV Actor – Drama/Action Adventure" and "Choice TV Actor – Drama" wins. McKenzie reportedly earned between about $15,000 and $25,000 per episode throughout the show's run.

The O.C. was the first time McKenzie played what The New York Times later described as the "quiet, guarded leading man" role he would repeatedly portray. As a result of the show's success, McKenzie appeared in magazines including People, In Touch Weekly and Us Weekly. He was ranked No. 5 in Independent Online's "100 Sexiest Men Alive" and twice appeared on Teen People magazine's annual list of "25 Sexiest Stars under 25". McKenzie was also voted one of [[InStyle|InStyle'''s]] "10 Hottest Bachelors of Summer" in July 2005. The O.C. dropped in ratings dramatically during its third and fourth seasons, and ended in early 2007.

While appearing in The O.C., McKenzie made his feature film debut in the Academy Award-nominated film Junebug alongside Amy Adams and Embeth Davidtz. The film was nominated for "Best International Film" and "Outstanding Ensemble Acting" in the Amanda Awards and won the Sarasota Film Festival award for "Outstanding Ensemble Acting". It also received high praise at the 2005 Sundance Film Festival. According to Production Weekly, McKenzie was set to star in the thriller Snakes on a Plane, formerly known as Pacific Air 121, but later dropped out to film 88 Minutes, which starred Al Pacino.

 2007–2019: Southland and Gotham 
In 2008, McKenzie earned critical acclaim for his solo performance in the "live on stage, on film" version of Dalton Trumbo's 1939 novel Johnny Got His Gun, his first starring role in a film. He stars as Joe Bonham, a role previously played by James Cagney, Jeff Daniels, and Timothy Bottoms. The movie premiered at the Paramount Theater in Austin, McKenzie's hometown, while he was filming the pilot for Southland. In 2009, he appeared in the short film The Eight Percent. The movie won the Delta Air Lines Fly-in Movie Contest and entered as an official selection on the Tribeca Film Festival's Short film category. 

McKenzie starred as rookie police officer Ben Sherman on the NBC drama Southland, which premiered on April 9, 2009. The show was canceled while in production on its second season. TNT bought the rights for the show and showed the seven episodes that had been produced. The show was subsequently renewed and ran for five seasons before being canceled in 2013. From September to October 2010, he starred in an off-Broadway transfer of The Glass Menagerie at the Mark Taper Forum in Los Angeles.

Following the end of Southland, McKenzie was cast in the CBS drama television pilot The Advocates, opposite Mandy Moore. The show was not produced. In late 2013, he was cast in the drama film The Swimmer, a Norwegian production that was not produced. In October 2013, he signed an exclusive talent deal with Warner Bros. Television Studios, the home of The O.C. and Southland. A few months later, in February 2014, it was announced that McKenzie was cast in the pilot of Gotham.

McKenzie returned to Fox in the Batman prequel television show Gotham, which premiered on September 22, 2014. In the series, he portrayed James Gordon as a young detective new to Gotham City. After five seasons and 100 episodes, the show concluded in April 2019. In the same series, he made his directorial debut with the season 3 episode "These Delicate and Dark Obsessions". McKenzie went on to direct "One of My Three Soups" and write "The Demon's Head" from the fourth season. 

In 2017, he appeared in the first season of The Accidental Wolf, a miniseries series created by Arian Moayed and the theater production company Waterwell. He shot Line of Duty, a real-time action thriller, in Birmingham, Alabama in early summer 2018; it was released in 2019.

 2019–present: New projects and theater 
Following the conclusion of Gotham in 2019, McKenzie indicated the end of one chapter in his career, turning to new efforts including writing and directing.

On June 24, 2019, McKenzie, along with an ensemble cast, presented The Investigation: A Search for the Truth in Ten Acts, a dramatic reading of Special Counsel Robert S. Mueller III's Report on the Investigation into Russian Interference in the 2016 Presidential Election. McKenzie portrayed President Donald Trump's former National Security Advisor Michael Flynn, as well as Donald Trump, Jr.

McKenzie made his Broadway debut on January 23, 2020, in the Second Stage production of Grand Horizons at the Hayes Theater. McKenzie starred as Ben, one of two sons struggling with their elderly parents' divorce. A limited-run production, the play began previews on December 23, 2019 and closed on March 1, 2020. In February 2022, it was announced that McKenzie would star in and produce Bloat, an internationally-produced J-horror film. In February 2023, it was announced that he would star in the ABC medical drama pilot The Hurt Unit which centers on a hospital urgent response team.

 Criticism of cryptocurrency 

Since 2021, McKenzie has been an outspoken critic of cryptocurrency. He is noted as one of the few celebrity skeptics of the technology. As such, he has been particularly critical of the proliferation of celebrity endorsements of unstable cryptocurrencies, their speculation, and NFTs.

With journalist Jacob Silverman, he has written a number of critical articles on crypto for publications including Slate, The New Republic, The Washington Post, and The Intercept. Together, they are writing the book Easy Money, to be released by Abrams Press in July 2023. They had a featured session on the topic at the 2022 SXSW Festival and McKenzie at WSJ Tech Live 2022 and the 2022 Web Summit. As a pundit, McKenzie has also appeared on CNN Business, CNBC, and CBS News to discuss the topic. He has been a guest on podcasts like What Next: TBD, Deconstructed, and Chapo Trap House, and radio programs Marketplace Tech and Morning Edition.

McKenzie testified at the United States Senate Committee on Banking, Housing, and Urban Affairs hearing "Crypto Crash: Why the FTX Bubble Burst and the Harm to Consumers” in December 2022.

McKenzie attributes his initial interest in the subject to his undergraduate degree in economics and friends' interest in cryptocurrency, as well as coursework on the blockchain from MIT professor and SEC chairman Gary Gensler and Capital in the Twenty-First Century by economist Thomas Piketty.

Personal life
In September 2015, actress Morena Baccarin said in a legal declaration involving her divorce from Austin Chick that she planned to marry her Gotham'' co-star, McKenzie, adding that she was pregnant with their child. Their daughter was born on March 2, 2016. Baccarin and McKenzie announced their engagement in November 2016. They were married on June 2, 2017 (Baccarin's 38th birthday) in Brooklyn, New York. They announced the birth of their son in March 2021. With Baccarin, McKenzie has one step-son.

Filmography

Film

Television

Audio

Theater

Bibliography

Awards and nominations

References

External links

 
 Ben McKenzie at IBDb
 Ben McKenzie at About the Artist
 
 

1978 births
21st-century American male actors
American people of Dutch-Jewish descent
American people of English descent
American people of Scottish descent
American male film actors
American male musical theatre actors
American male television actors
American male voice actors
Austin High School (Austin, Texas) alumni
Living people
Male actors from Austin, Texas
University of Virginia alumni
People associated with cryptocurrency